Austin Herbert Woolrych  (18 May 191814 September 2004) was an English historian, a specialist in the period of the English Civil War.

Early life and education
Austin Woolrych was born in Marylebone, London, the son of Stanley Herbert Cunliffe Woolrych and May Gertrude Woolrych, née Wood. His father was a distinguished British Army intelligence officer during the First World War who became a businessman. Woolrych was descended from an old Shropshire gentry family, and was related to Sir Thomas Wolryche, 1st Baronet, Royalist governor of Bridgnorth during the English Civil War.

Woolrych was educated at Westminster School, but owing to the family's financial distress during the Great Depression he did not proceed to university. Instead, he left school in 1934, aged 16, and became a clerk at Harrods. In 1938, he joined the Inns of Court Regiment of the Territorial Army. On the outbreak of the Second World War he was sent to Royal Military College, Sandhurst, and commissioned into the Royal Tank Regiment. He was blinded in one eye at the Battle of El Alamein in 1941.

After the war, Woolrych was decommissioned with the rank of Captain, and attended Pembroke College, Oxford on an ex-serviceman's educational grant; he originally planned to read English, but owing to the college's lack of a tutor read History instead. He graduated from Oxford with a BA (first-class honours) and a BLitt.

Academic career
Woolrych joined the History Department at the University of Leeds in 1949.  He remained there until 1964 when he became Professor of History at the newly founded University of Lancaster. From 1971 to 1975 he was Pro-Vice-Chancellor of the University of Lancaster. From 1981 to 1982 he was Visiting Fellow of All Souls College, Oxford. 

He retired in 1983. Freed from administrative work and teaching, he published several major works in retirement.

Honours
Woolrych was elected a Fellow of the British Academy (FBA) in 1988.

Marriage and children
Woolrych married Muriel Edith Rolfe in 1941; she died in 1991. They had one son and one daughter.

Select Publications

References
Obituary in The Guardian

1918 births
2004 deaths
20th-century British historians
Alumni of Pembroke College, Oxford
People educated at Westminster School, London
Royal Tank Regiment officers
Fellows of the British Academy
People from Marylebone
Academics of Lancaster University
Academics of the University of Leeds
British Army personnel of World War II
Academics from London